Cyrtocara moorii, commonly known as the hump-head, is a species of haplochromine cichlid endemic to Lake Malawi in east Africa where they prefer areas with sandy substrates.  It can grow to a length of  TL. The species is popular among aquarium keepers where it is known as the hump-head cichlid, blue dolphin cichlid, Malawi dolphin or simply as moorii.  It is currently the only known member of its genus. The specific name honours the English cytologist and biologist John Edmund Sharrock Moore (1870-1947).

Description
They are varying shades of blue, ranging from turquoise to a silvery-blue, and grow a distinctive hump on their forehead. The male is usually brighter blue than the female.

Aquarium care
The Malawi dolphin is best kept at temperatures of 75–78 °F.  It is relatively tame except when it is spawning.

The minimum aquarium size should be 48 gallons but increased as the fish grows larger.

See also
List of freshwater aquarium fish species

References

Haplochromini

Monotypic Perciformes genera
Cichlid genera
Monotypic freshwater fish genera
Taxa named by George Albert Boulenger
Fish described in 1902
Taxobox binomials not recognized by IUCN